The  Miss Illinois USA pageant is a competition that selects the representative for the state Illinois in the Miss USA pageant. It is directed by Vanbros and Associates and is previously directed by D&D Productions from 2001 to 2014 before becoming part of Vanbros organization in 2014, headquartered in Lenexa, Kansas.

Illinois is one of the most successful states in the competition.  It is one of only four states to have won four or more Miss USA titles and one of only four states to win two Miss USA titles in consecutive years.  All four winners came from the early history of the competition, with their last Miss USA being Karen Morrison, who held the title in 1974.  The pageant's most successful years were from 1984 to 1996, when all but two delegates made the cut at Miss USA.  That period was followed by many years without a placement.

In 1986, sisters Tricia and Laura Bach won the title consecutively, the first occasion of this in the history of the Miss Universe organization. Later on, in 1994, Kathleen Farrell, sister of Miss Florida USA 1988, won the title, making the state pageant the first to have two sisters compete in Miss USA.

Until 2013, no Illinois delegate had previously competed at Miss Illinois Teen USA but one was previously competed in Miss Illinois, Stacie Juris became the first former Teen titleholder to appear a crossover in Miss USA, the second-to-the last state to do so (Washington would make its first Teen to Miss crossover four years later). The most recent placement was Angel Reyes placing 4th runner-up in 2022.

Angel Reyes of Chicago was crowned Miss Illinois USA 2022 on May 30, 2022 at Braden Auditorium in Normal. She represented Illinois for the title of Miss USA 2022, finished as 4th runner-up.

Results summary

Placements
Miss USAs: Myrna Hansen (1953), Marite Ozers (1963), Amanda Jones (1973), Karen Morrison (1974)
2nd runners-up: Laura Bach (1985), Nichole Holmes (1995), Stacie Juris (2013)
3rd runners-up: June Pickney (1958), Debra Niego (1979), Jill Gulseth (2005), Sydni Dion Bennett (2021)
4th runners-up: Celeste Ravel (1954), Angel Reyes (2022)
Top 5/6: Lisa Morgan (1991), Whitney Wandland (2017)
Top 10/12: Kathy Schmalen (1976), LaVonne Misselle (1984), Tricia Bach (1986), Joan Berge (1987), Gina Zordani (1988), Kelly Holub (1989), Carla Myers (1990), Kathleen Farrell (1994), Bernadette Przybycien (1996), Olivia Pura (2020)
Top 15: Dianne Daniggelis (1955), Marianne Gaba (1957), Jean Donnelly (1962), Beverly Lacek (1967), Catherine Warren (2006), Renee Wronecki (2015)

Illinois holds a record of 31 placements at Miss USA.

Awards
Miss Photogenic: Elizabeth Curran (1977), Nichole Holmes (1995), Angel Reyes (2022)
Best State Costume: Kelly Holub (1989)

Titleholders

Color key

References

External links
Miss Illinois USA website

Illinois
Illinois culture
Women in Illinois
Recurring events established in 1952
1952 establishments in Illinois
Annual events in Illinois